Bahçe station is a railway station in Turkey.

Main passenger in the station is Fırat Express (Adana-Elazığ train).

References

Railway stations in Osmaniye Province
Buildings and structures in Osmaniye Province
Bahçe District
Railway stations opened in 1913
1913 establishments in the Ottoman Empire